Saint Theophilus (Greek: Θεόφιλος; died 195) was a bishop of Caesarea Maritima and teacher of Clement of Alexandria. He is known for his opposition to the Quartodecimans. He is commemorated on 5 March and his name means "Love of The God".

See also
Clement of Alexandria

External links
Opera Omnia by Migne Patrologia Graeca with Analytical Indexes

195 deaths
2nd-century bishops in the Roman Empire
2nd-century Christian saints
Year of birth unknown
Bishops of Caesarea